In Hinduism, Kamalā  or Kamalātmikā, also known as Kamalālayā is considered to be the Tantric characterisation of the goddess of prosperity, Lakshmi. In Shaktism, she is represented as the Devi in the fullness of her graceful aspect. She is believed to be the tenth and the last Mahavidya. She is also considered to be the last form of the goddess Adi Parashakti.

Iconography
In Shakti tradition, the lotus goddess is exalted thus:

The fact that Kamala is associated with elephants has two connotations: Firstly, elephants are harbingers of clouds and rain in Hinduism, thus indicating fertility; Secondly, as a powerful creature, it represents royal authority and divinity. Her relationship with the lotus suggests that she exists in a state of refinement that transcends the material world, and yet is rooted in it.

Relationship with Vishnu 
While Lakshmi is portrayed as a loving wife to Narayana and is often depicted as massaging his feet in her submissive role, Kamala is rendered more independent in her role, more candidly performing her duties as the goddess who ushers in bliss and prosperity. While she is still deemed as the beloved of Vishnu, she is less performative of her marital and domestic obligations to him. She is also depicted to be a more fearsome goddess who is to be reckoned in her own right, some of her epithets in Tantric traditions including Bhima (terrible), Kalaratri (black night), and Tamasi (darkness), indicating that she is not reliant on him for his preservation and can fight evil with her own powers. In her Mahavidya context, she is also rarely associated with incarnations of Lakshmi such as Sita and Rukmini, though she is identified as two of the Saptamatrikas who are also forms associated with Vishnu, Varahi, and Vaishnavi.

Notes

Further reading
Hindu Goddesses: Vision of the Divine Feminine in the Hindu Religious Traditions by David Kinsley

Hindu goddesses
Mahavidyas
Lakshmi